Charles Stansfield (13 December 1884 – 1941) was an Austrian footballer. He played in two matches for the Austria national football team from 1904 to 1905, scoring four goals.

References

External links
 

1884 births
1941 deaths
Austrian footballers
Austria international footballers
Place of birth missing
Association footballers not categorized by position